Concord Township is one of sixteen townships in Hancock County, Iowa, USA. At the 2000 census, its population was 3,246.

History
Concord Township was founded in 1869.

Geography
According to the United States Census Bureau, Concord Township covers an area of 35.83 square miles (92.79 square kilometers); of this, 35.74 square miles (92.57 square kilometers, 99.76 percent) is land and 0.08 square miles (0.22 square kilometers, 0.24 percent) is water.

Cities, towns, villages
 Garner (vast majority)

Unincorporated towns
 Hayfield Junction at 
(This list is based on USGS data and may include former settlements.)

Adjacent townships
 Ellington Township (north)
 Grant Township, Cerro Gordo County (northeast)
 Clear Lake Township, Cerro Gordo County (east)
 Union Township, Cerro Gordo County (southeast)
 Ell Township (south)
 Liberty Township (southwest)
 Garfield Township (west)
 Madison Township (northwest)

Cemeteries
The township contains these two cemeteries: Concord and Saint Johns.

Major highways
  U.S. Route 18

Landmarks
 Concord Park

School districts
 Garner-Hayfield Community School District
 Ventura Community School District

Political districts
 Iowa's 4th congressional district
 State House District 11
 State Senate District 6

References
 United States Census Bureau 2008 TIGER/Line Shapefiles
 United States Board on Geographic Names (GNIS)
 United States National Atlas

External links
 US-Counties.com
 City-Data.com

Townships in Hancock County, Iowa
Townships in Iowa